The Atlanta Braves are a Major League Baseball (MLB) franchise based in Atlanta. The Braves formed in 1871 as the Boston Red Stockings. After moving in 1953 to Milwaukee for 12 years and a World Series Championship in '57, the Braves relocated to Atlanta in 1966. Through 2010, the Braves have played 20,053 games, winning 9,945, losing 9,954, and tying 154, for a winning percentage of approximately .500. This list documents the superlative records and accomplishments of team members during their tenures in MLB.

Hank Aaron holds the most franchise records as of the end of the 2010 season, with ten, including most career hits, doubles, and the best career on-base plus slugging percentage. Aaron also held the career home runs record from April 8, 1974 until August 8, 2007. He is followed by Hugh Duffy, who holds eight records, including best single-season batting average and the best single-season slugging percentage record.

Four Braves players currently hold Major League Baseball records. Duffy holds the best single-season batting average record, accumulating an average of .440 in 1894. Bob Horner and Bobby Lowe are tied with 16 others for the most home runs in a game, with four, which they recorded on May 30, 1890, and July 6, 1986, respectively. Red Barrett, a Brave for six years, holds the record for fewest pitches by a single pitcher in a complete game, with 58, which he achieved on August 10, 1944.

On September 9, 2020, the Braves scored a franchise record 29 runs in a game against the Miami Marlins at Truist Park. In the second inning, there were 11 runs scored. Adam Duval hit three home runs, including a grand slam in the seventh inning. On September 22, 2020, the Braves won their third division title in a row, making the franchise record a league-leading 20 Eastern Division titles.

In the Wildcard Playoff series against the Cincinnati Reds during the 2020 postseason, the Braves and Reds played thirteen innings until Freddie Freeman singled in the winning run for the Braves. During the series, the Braves set another record against the Reds. Braves pitchers held the Reds scoreless through all 22 innings of their National League Wild Card Series victory, meaning Cincinnati surpassed the 1921 Giants (20 innings) for the most consecutive scoreless innings to begin a postseason series. The Braves are also the first team to win a multi-game postseason series (excluding the Wild Card Game) without surrendering a run. The Yankees previously held the low mark after allowing just one total run to the Rangers in back-to-back three-game sweeps of the 1998 and ’99 ALDS.

Table key

Individual career records
Batting statistics; pitching statistics

Individual single-season records
Batting statistics; pitching statistics

Individual single-game records
Source: Fewest pitches by a single pitcher in a complete game source:

Team season records
Source:

Team all-time records
Source:

Notes
 Lowe and Horner are two of 18 players in MLB history to hit four home runs in one game.

See also
Baseball statistics
Atlanta Braves award winners and league leaders

References

External links

Team Records
Major League Baseball team records